The Lower Manhattan attack may refer to several attacks that have occurred in Lower Manhattan, New York City, over the years:
 Wall Street bombing, 1920
 1975 Fraunces Tavern bombing
 1993 World Trade Center bombing
 September 11 attacks, 2001
 2017 New York City truck attack